The 1942 Colorado Buffaloes football team was an American football team that represented the University of Colorado as a member of the Mountain States Conference (MSC) during the 1942 college football season. Led by second-year head coach James J. Yeager, the Buffaloes compiled an overall record of 7–2  with a mark of 5–1 in conference play, sharing the MSC title with Utah.

Schedule

References

Colorado
Colorado Buffaloes football seasons
Mountain States Conference football champion seasons
Colorado Buffaloes football